Aberdovey Lifeboat Station (Welsh: Aberdyfi) is an RNLI lifeboat station in the coastal village of Aberdyfi, Gwynedd, West Wales, on the Dyfi estuary in Cardigan Bay. It was established in 1853, but there has been a lifeboat serving the village since 1837.

Since 1998 the station has operated an  inshore lifeboat, RNLB Sandwell Lifeline (B-758), launched by tractor.

History
The first Aberdyfi lifeboat was bought in 1837. The RNLI took over the station in 1853 and in 1858 built a new boathouse for the lifeboat and carriage. A tragedy occurred in 1862 when crew member Owen Owen, aged 33, died as a result of a capsize on exercise. 

In February 1863 David Williams was awarded an RNLI Silver Medal for putting out to the stranded brig Friends and his crew were voted £8 reward by the Institution. In September the same year the RNLI voted to reward the crew of the lifeboat £4 10s for rescuing six crew of the stranded barque William Bromham.

In 1886 a plot was bought for £150 and a new boathouse built for £320.

There was a second tragedy in 1898 when crew member John Price, aged 72, lost his life trying to save people after a boating accident. His dependants were awarded £50 compensation by the RNLI's Committee of Management.

A slipway for the lifeboat was built at a cost of £300 in 1903 to enable the lifeboat to be launched into the river. The station closed in 1931, but was reopened in 1963 at the Outward Bound Sea School as an inshore station supplied with a D-class lifeboat, which in 1974 was replaced by an   lifeboat.

A new boathouse was built in 1991 to house the Atlantic 21 and its launching tractor, a shop and crew facilities, and in 1995 an upper floor was built to provide a crew room, galley and store.

Since 1998 the station has operated an  inshore lifeboat, RNLB Sandwell Lifeline (B-758), launched by tractor, and making an average of 25 emergency launches a year. She replaced B-559 which has transferred to the British Virgin Islands as a rescue craft.

Fleet

All Weather lifeboats (ALBs)

Inshore lifeboats (ILBs)

Awards
A number of awards have been made to recognise exemplary service.
 1863 RNLI Silver Medal to David Williams of H.M. Customs for putting out in the lifeboat in a February gale to rescue of the crew of the brigantine Friends
 1972 Framed Letter of Thanks to David Williams for service from 1920 to 1931
 1974 RNLI Bronze Medal to David Williams for the rescue of three children from cabin cruiser Lady Jane

Visitor access
This station is classed as an RNLI "Discover" lifeboat station which welcomes visitors normally during the summer months.

See also
 List of RNLI stations
 Royal National Lifeboat Institution lifeboats

References

External links
 Aberdovey Lifeboat Station on RNLI website

Lifeboat stations in Wales
Aberdyfi
Transport infrastructure completed in 1853